Brown v. Davenport, 596 U.S. ___ (2022), was a case decided by the United States Supreme Court. The case concerned whether habeas relief may be granted if the Brecht v. Abrahamson test alone is satisfied, or if the application of Chapman v. California by the state courts was unreasonable because of AEDPA. The court held that federal courts can not grant habeas relief when state courts have already ruled on a prisoner's claim, unless the situation satisfies the test laid out in Brecht v. Abrahamson, and the test laid out in AEDPA.

Background 
In 2008, Ervine Davenport was convicted of first-degree murder. His conviction was challenged because during his trial he had been placed in shackles. His wrists, waist, and ankles were all restrained, but there was a curtain to prevent the jury from seeing the shackles. The state said that although the shackles were unconstitutional, they did not effect the jury's verdict. Michigan's Court of Appeals agreed with the state. The Michigan Supreme Court disagreed, however, after several jurors testified that they had seen the shackles or heard comments about them, and then sent the case back to the lower courts. The lower court again determined that the shackles did not affect the verdict, and the appellate court agreed with the state once again, and the Michigan Supreme Court denied an appeal.

Davenport then challenged his conviction in the federal courts. The district court refused to hear the case. He then petitioned the U.S. Court of Appeals for the 6th Circuit, which agreed the hear the case. This appeals court cited the Deck v. Missouri decision, and quoted from Holbrook v. Flynn: "shackling is inherently prejudicial". The court found that the state had not met the burden of proof necessary to show that the jury was not influenced by the shackling, and provided habeas relief, over the dissent of Judge Chad Readler. The state attempted to have the decision stayed, but the court declined.

References

External links 
 

2022 in United States case law
United States Supreme Court cases
United States Supreme Court cases of the Roberts Court
Antiterrorism and Effective Death Penalty Act case law